Hollywood Wives is a 1983 novel by the British author Jackie Collins. It was her ninth novel, and her most successful, selling over 15 million copies.

Hollywood Wives tells the stories of several women in Hollywood, ranging all the way from long-time talent agents and screenwriters to vivacious screen vixens and young, innocent newcomers.

After the novel's  international success, it was adapted as a television miniseries by producer Aaron Spelling that aired on ABC in February 1985. It was a ratings hit, and one of the most successful mini-series of the 1980s.

Collins went on to pen several more "Hollywood" titled books, including Hollywood Husbands (1986), Hollywood Kids (1994), Hollywood Wives: The New Generation (2001), and Hollywood Divorces (2003). Although these further novels tend to be separate works rather than direct sequels, characters from the original Hollywood Wives have made brief appearances in them.

Main characters
 Elaine Conti - a Bronx girl turned Hollywood hostess who is desperate to stay at the top while her marriage to former screen sex symbol Ross Conti crumbles beneath her. She is a compulsive shoplifter who lives in Beverly Hills. Elaine is a woman ruthlessly driven to improve both her husband's career and her own standing within Tinseltown.
 Marilee Gray - Elaine's close friend and the first wife of director Neil Gray. She lives a life of leisure, paid for by her ex-husband's alimony.
 Karen Lancaster - the daughter of super celebrity George Lancaster. Also one of Elaine's friends, but that does not stop her from making a play for Elaine's husband Ross Conti.
 Sadie LaSalle - a Hollywood casting agent and starmaker who was responsible for Ross Conti's stardom. Now one of the most powerful women in Hollywood, Sadie eventually discovers Buddy Hudson.
 Ross Conti - a one-time screen legend, but now a faded Hollywood star. Ross is about to turn 50 and is without a viable career.
 Neil Gray - a top British film director and recovering alcoholic.
 Jason Swankle - a top interior designer who also runs a male escort agency which caters to lonely rich women.
 Bibi Sutton - another Hollywood society hostess and gossip.
 Montana Gray - a talented screenwriter who is determined to break the glass ceiling of Hollywood studios. She is Neil Gray's second (and current) wife.
 Gina Germaine - already a successful movie star, she is willing to do anything to advance her career and be taken seriously as an actress, including blackmail.
 George Lancaster - a beloved Hollywood superstar and a contemporary of Ross Conti's but still successful.
 Oliver Easterne - an arrogant, abrasive Hollywood studio boss.
 Buddy Hudson - a young, aspiring actor and former hustler with ambitions of stardom regardless of his past life and his new bride.
 Angel Hudson - Buddy's new wife. Her youth, beauty and innocence make her a target for some of Hollywood's more unscrupulous characters.
 Pamela Lancaster - the second wife of Hollywood star George Lancaster and the stepmother of Karen Lancaster.
 Deke Andrews - a mentally deranged young man from Philadelphia, who makes his way to Hollywood to find his birth parents, leaving a trail of death and destruction in his wake.
 Det. Leon Rosemont - a Philadelphia cop who pursues Deke across the U.S.

References

External links
 

Novels by Jackie Collins
1983 British novels
Novels about actors
Hollywood novels
HarperCollins books
Novels set in Palm Springs, California
Women in California